Paper Bicycle is a Scottish bicycle manufacturer based in Ayrshire.  It is also the name of the bicycle that the company produces.  This is derived from the fact that the original prototype had its chaincase panels covered with wallpaper.

The Paper Bicycle company was founded to develop a prototype that had been rejected by the Royal Mail as a replacement for the Pashley Mailstar.  Part of the design brief had been to develop a bicycle that would fit 'everyone'.  The result was a bicycle without a top tube or seat stays.  Instead, horizontal rigidity was achieved by an additional 'chaincase' on the non-drive side of the frame.

The Paper Bicycle utilizes a powder-coated cromo-steel frame that is fabricated in Taiwan and finished in Scotland.  The frame's design is licensed to the Swiss company Velobility who use it as the basis for bicycle share schemes in cities across Austria, Germany and Switzerland.

References

Cycle manufacturers of the United Kingdom
Manufacturing companies of Scotland
Public transport in Austria
Public transport in Germany
Scottish brands
Transport in Switzerland